Jay Red Eagle is a Native American flautist and Native American artist whose businesses include lines of music clothing called Nashville Threads and M.T. Medicine Bottle. His clothing and shoe designs include country music and Native American clothing, Hip hop clothing, and the first ever Cherokee shoes specifically designed using the Cherokee syllabary and language. He is an enrolled member of the Cherokee Nation. His debut CD was entitled Vision. He was born in Tahlequah, Oklahoma, and in 2010 he released a second CD titled Cherokee Nation which is also composed of Native American flute music.

Red Eagle won two Music Awards in 2006: Best Native American Artist of the Year and Native American Flutist of the Year.  In 2007 Red Eagle was voted Flutist of the Year a second time.

References
Music Awards 2006-02-22
Red lake News Article

External links
Jay Red Eagle's MySpace Page
Cherokee Nation Website
Jay Red Eagle Music Downloads
2007 Oklahoma Music Awards 
Amazing Grace - Native American Flute Video
Native Radio
Vision on Cdbaby.com by Jay Red Eagle

Cherokee Nation artists
Year of birth missing (living people)
Living people
People from Tahlequah, Oklahoma
Cherokee artists
Native American textile artists
Native American flautists
Musicians from Oklahoma
21st-century Native Americans